Wakeville Village is an unincorporated community in Wayne Township, Noble County, in the U.S. state of Indiana.

Geography

References

Unincorporated communities in Noble County, Indiana
Unincorporated communities in Indiana